Bruno Mazzia (born 14 March 1941) is an Italian professional football coach and a former player.

After Mazzia retired from playing, he became a football manager.

Honours
 Serie A: 1960–61

References

1941 births
Living people
Italian footballers
Serie A players
Serie B players
Serie C players
Juventus F.C. players
Venezia F.C. players
S.S. Lazio players
Brescia Calcio players
A.C. Perugia Calcio players
Reggina 1914 players
U.S. Alessandria Calcio 1912 players
F.C. Pro Vercelli 1892 players
Italian football managers
A.S.G. Nocerina managers
U.S. Lecce managers
L.R. Vicenza managers
Mantova 1911 managers
U.S. Cremonese managers
Udinese Calcio managers
Brescia Calcio managers
Calcio Padova managers
Association football midfielders
A.S.D. La Biellese players